Nea Palatia (Greek: Νέα Παλάτια literally "New Palaces") is a community in East Attica, Greece. Since the 2011 local government reform it is part of the municipality Oropos, of which it is a community. It is part of Athens metropolitan area.

Geography

Nea Palatia is a seaside town, situated on the south coast of the South Euboean Gulf. The town Skala Oropou is directly adjacent to its west. It is 8 km south of Eretria (on the island Euboea). The Greek National Road 79 connects it with Motorway 1 (Athens-Thessaloniki-Evzones) near Malakasa.

Subdivisions
Agios Konstantinos (pop. 386 in 2011)
Nea Palatia (pop. 2,723)
Agios Athanasios (pop. 99)
Agia Aikaterini (pop. 57)
Pontioi (pop. 308)

Historical population

References

External links
GTP Travel Pages (Community)

Populated places in East Attica
Oropos